State Road 252 (SR 252) in the U.S. state of Indiana consists of two segments. The western stretch runs from Interstate 69 and State Road 37 in Martinsville to State Road 9 between Hope and Shelbyville.  The eastern stretch is from U.S. Route 52/State Road 1 in Brookville to the Ohio state line near Scipio, Ohio.

Route description

Western section 
The western section heads southeast from Martinsville. SR 252 heads southeast until Morgantown where it turns northeast towards Trafalgar. SR 252 heads east from Trafalgar towards U.S. Route 31 (US 31). US 31 and SR 252 have a concurrency that ends near Edinburgh. SR 252 passes easterly through Edinburgh to an interchange with Interstate 65 (I-65) where the SR 252 designation terminates. The road continues as a county road to SR 9 named Old State Rd 252.

Eastern section 
From the western terminus of this section at US 52/SR 1, SR 252 heads east towards Ohio.  On the way to Ohio SR 252 passes through Mt. Carmel.  At the Ohio state line SR 252 ends at an intersection with Ohio State Route 126, near Ohio State Route 129.

History 
In the 1930s the western section of SR 252 was to end at SR 29, now U.S. Route 421, but the section from I-65 to SR 29 was never built. The western section ended at Flat Rock until a new part of the road was built to SR 9 in the winter of 2005-2006. Originally SR 252 went along Hospital Road and through what is now Camp Atterbury and Atterbury Fish and Wildlife Area. It was moved north to its current location after Camp Atterbury was built. As of January 19, 2020, SR 252 no longer heads east towards SR 9, per INDOT.

Major intersections

References

External Link

252
Transportation in Franklin County, Indiana
Transportation in Johnson County, Indiana
Transportation in Morgan County, Indiana
Transportation in Shelby County, Indiana